Sean Patrick Thomas is an American actor. He is best known for his role as Derek Reynolds in the 2001 film Save the Last Dance and as Jimmy James in Barbershop (2002), Barbershop 2: Back in Business (2004), and Barbershop: The Next Cut (2016), as well as his television role as Detective Temple Page in The District and as Professor Macalester in Vixen (2015–2016).

Early life
Thomas was born in Washington, D.C., the son of emigrants from Guyana. He was raised in Wilmington, Delaware,  the son of Cheryl, a financial analyst for DuPont, and Carlton Thomas, an engineer who also worked for DuPont.

Thomas, who has two younger siblings, graduated from Brandywine High School in Delaware and attended the University of Virginia. He originally intended to study law, but upon successfully auditioning for a role in the play A Raisin in the Sun, Thomas changed directions and decided to attend New York University's prestigious Graduate Acting Program at the Tisch School of the Arts, graduating in 1995.

Career
Thomas began appearing in screen roles in the mid-1990s, and had minor roles in several films, including Conspiracy Theory (1997), Can't Hardly Wait (1998), and Cruel Intentions (1999). His first leading role was in the teen romance Save the Last Dance, in which he starred opposite Julia Stiles. The film opened in January 2001 and became successful among teen audiences, grossing over $90 million domestically. Subsequently, Thomas appeared in supporting roles in the films Barbershop and Halloween: Resurrection, both of which were released in 2002. Thomas was a cast member on The District, a television crime drama that aired on CBS from 2000 to 2004.

Thomas played recurring character Alan Townsend on Reaper. He originated the recurring character of Karl Dupree on Lie to Me. In 2009, he took to the stage, playing the title role in Othello for the Theatre for a New Audience in New York. This production moved to the Intiman Theatre in Seattle for the summer. In 2012, he worked with Ioan Gruffudd and Sarah Michelle Gellar in Ringer. He was originally cast as Cyborg for Justice League: Throne of Atlantis, replacing Shemar Moore from Justice League: War, who was initially not available to reprise his role. But after Sean Patrick Thomas recorded the role, Shemar Moore was available again so Andrea Romano, for the sake of continuity, recast Thomas with Shemar Moore who lip synced to the earlier performance of Thomas. Patrick Thomas portrayed Dr. Michael Cayle in the horror film Deep in the Darkness, based on the Michael Laimo novel with the same name.

Personal life
Thomas married actress Aonika Laurent in New Orleans on Saturday, April 22, 2006. Their original wedding date had been Saturday, November 5, 2005, but had to be postponed due to Hurricane Katrina. The couple met at a party thrown by Barbershop director Tim Story. The couple has two children.

Filmography

Film

Television

References

External links 

interview, September 16, 2002, Hollywood Insider
interview, 2001, PopMatters

Living people
American male film actors
American male television actors
American male voice actors
Male actors from Delaware
American people of Guyanese descent
African-American male actors
Male actors from Wilmington, Delaware
University of Virginia alumni
20th-century American male actors
21st-century American male actors
20th-century African-American people
21st-century African-American people
Tisch School of the Arts alumni
21st-century American actors
Year of birth missing (living people)